St. Thomas the Apostle Church is a Catholic parish in Glen Mills, Delaware County, Pennsylvania, United States. Its historic church, located at 430 Valleybrook Road, was built in 1856.

It was the first parish in the Archdiocese of Philadelphia and the oldest in the state of Pennsylvania.

History
St. Thomas the Apostle Church began as a Catholic mission in Delaware County, Pennsylvania in 1730 in Concord Township at the home of the Thomas Willcox family.  In 1837, Saint Mary's Chapel was built as part of the new Willcox mansion. The mansion was added to the National Register of Historic Places in 1972 as part of the Ivy Mills Historic District. 

A tract of land was purchased from Nicholas F. Walter for the construction of a church on August 26, 1852.   The cost of the new church was carried chiefly by the proprietor of Ivy Mills, James M. Willcox. Construction was completed in 1856 and the cornerstone was dedicated by Bishop St.John Neumann.  In 1957, an elementary school and convent were built.  In 1991, a larger church was built next to the original St. Thomas' Church.

Notable burials
 Lawrence A. Conner, Sr. – Pennsylvania State Representative for Delaware County (1953–54)

References

External links
 
 

1730 establishments in Pennsylvania
Cemeteries in Delaware County, Pennsylvania
Churches in Delaware County, Pennsylvania
Religious organizations established in 1730
Roman Catholic churches in Pennsylvania